Dmitri Igorevich Belov (born 31 March 1995) is a Russian football player.

Club career
He made his debut in the Russian Football National League for FC Shinnik Yaroslavl on 11 July 2016 in a game against FC Baltika Kaliningrad.

References

External links
 Profile by Russian Football National League

1995 births
Footballers from Yaroslavl
Living people
Russian footballers
FC Shinnik Yaroslavl players
Association football forwards
FC Dynamo Saint Petersburg players
FC Znamya Truda Orekhovo-Zuyevo players
FC Chernomorets Novorossiysk players
FC Torpedo Vladimir players